Wilbur Owen Fox (January 19, 1919 – January 26, 1991) was an American professional basketball player. He played in the National Basketball League for the Akron Goodyear Wingfoots and averaged 1.0 points per game for his career.

References

1919 births
1991 deaths
Akron Goodyear Wingfoots players
American men's basketball players
Basketball players from Ohio
Centers (basketball)
Forwards (basketball)
People from Dover, Ohio